Jermaine Ean Harrison (born 12 September 1985) is a Jamaican cricketer who has played for Jamaica in West Indian domestic cricket. He made his List A debut in January 2016, opening the batting with John Campbell against Trinidad and Tobago in the 2015–16 Regional Super50. Outside of playing cricket, Harrison is a member of the Jamaica Defence Force.

References

External links
Player profile and statistics at ESPNcricinfo

1985 births
Living people
Jamaica cricketers
Jamaican cricketers
Cricketers from Kingston, Jamaica